Veronique Chevalier (born Berenice Chloe Sztuczka) is a France-born American mistress of ceremonies, singer-songwriter, music producer, comedian and parodist popular in the steampunk community. She produces live cabaret in Southern California and is an emcee of steampunk events nationwide.

Life and career 

Chevalier attended Oregon State University in Corvallis, graduating with a Bachelor of Science in Liberal Studies, and is a trained classical ballet dancer.

Since 2005, Chevalier has been producing and hosting "Veronique's Red Velvet Variety Show", a live vaudeville and cabaret production featuring local as well as "big name" musical performers, unusual acts, magic, burlesque and comedy. Former performers in Chevalier's shows include Unextraordinary Gentlemen and Unwoman. Recent shows have also been cosponsored by Gilded Age Records and SepiaChord.com.

Chevalier has a credited cameo role in the 2005 short film mocumentary, Camp Burlesque, and also appears in the companion book Postcards from Camp Burlesque.

Chevalier is also a singer and songwriter. In 2005 she produced an "info-tainment" benefit project—a theatrical show and recording—called Cabaret4Choice. The recording garnered Chevalier the Unanimous Choice Award for Best Independent Cabaret Artist at the 14th Annual Los Angeles Music Awards.

In 2008 she produced the album, "Polka Haunt Us", featuring guest artists including Lili Haydn, Kerry Christensen, Marion Ramsey, and Vinny Golia. The album was a critical success, and was an official entry on the 51st Annual Grammy ballot in the Polka category (the final year prior to a decision by The National Academy of Recording Arts and Sciences to discontinue the category). Her song, "Beer Hall in Hell" has been played on the Dr. Demento radio show, and her song, "Vampire Surprise" won The Mad Music Archive's 2007 "Best New Halloween Song". Chevalier is also one of twenty artists featured on "A Sepiachord Passport", a compilation recording released by Projekt Records. Her track, a tango entitled, "The Dance Master", has received favorable reviews.

In May 2010, Chevalier performed at The Steampunk World's Fair in Piscataway, New Jersey. In July 2010 she was emcee of the Saturday steampunk "after-party" at San Diego Comic-Con International, where the headliners included The Slow Poisoner, Unextraordinary Gentlemen and Voltaire.

In March 2011, Chevalier was the MC and opened for Unextraordinary Gentlemen and Abney Park at Wild Wild West Con, a steampunk convention and festival held at Old Tucson Studios in Tucson, Arizona. In October 2011, she was asked to MC Amanda Palmer's solo show (kicking off a West Coast tour) in San Diego, CA, and in November, she performed the Welcome Song at the opening ceremonies at the steampunk convention TeslaCon in Madison, WI.

In September 2012 Veronique was a Featured Guest at Stan Lee's Comikaze Expo and hosted a panel entitled, "Steampunk 'Super'-Culture: Symbiosis Between Various Sub-Cultures & Fandoms". Panelists included steampunk master magician Pop Haydn, Disney artist Brian Kesinger, and members of The League of STEAM. She has since repeated the panel at other conventions, including Comic-Con and TeslaCon.

In December 2012, TeslaCon named its music performance hall the "Chevalier Music Hall" in her honor. Veronique is also a featured portrait in Brian Kesinger's steampunk fantasy series, "Tea Girls."

Stage persona 

Like many in the steampunk community, Chevalier has assumed a "stage persona" and created a backstory for it:

Discography 
 Albums
 Cabaret4Choice (2005) (Executive Producer)
 Polka Haunt Us (2008)

 Singles
 Vampire Surprise (2007)
 Beer Hall in Hell (2009)
 Escargots (parody of La Vie en rose) (2009)
 Internet Date (2010)

See also
List of steampunk works: Steampunk musicians

References

External links 

 

Living people
Musicians with fictional stage personas
Parody musicians
American comedy musicians
American parodists
American women singer-songwriters
American novelty song performers
Polka musicians
Dark cabaret musicians
Steampunk
Steampunk music
Oregon State University alumni
Year of birth missing (living people)
Cultural depictions of Maurice Chevalier
Women in punk